Gladys "G'dah" Oyenbot is a Ugandan actress, singer and producer professionally known by her mononym Oyenbot. She is known for playing Dorotia on Mpeke Town (2018), and as Beatrice on the award winning drama series Yat Madit Yat Madit (2016). In 2020 she starred in numerous films including a thriller film The Girl in the Yellow Jumper, in a legal drama film Kafa Coh, Family Tree, and Down Hill. She also had starring roles in a romantic drama series Love Makanika (2015) by Dilman Dila, Reflections (2018) by Nana Kagga and 5 @Home(2017) which aired on Fox Life Africa. 
Her other notable screen work includes a Haunted Soul (2013), Day 256(2017), Communion(2018), King of Darkness (2015), and Kyenvu (2018) the multi award winning short film she co- produced alongside Hedwyn Kyambadde.

Career
In 2016 Oyenbot starred in a regular role as Beatrice, a mother, and wife who suffered domestic violence silently on Yat Madit TV series that aired on NTV Uganda.

She also stars as Amanda, a lady with trust issues from her past relationships who falls in love with a married man, and father of her unborn child on the upcoming Nana Kagga’s TV series titled Reflections.

Oyenbot starred in Mira Nair’s Walt Disney movie Queen of Katwe as the shopkeeper. She also played Lupita Nyong'os stand in and  body double on set of the same film.

Oyenbot has participated in numerous stage productions. She is especially known for her outstanding performances in Matei Vișniec's play, "The Body of a Woman as a Battlefield in the Bosnian War"; an Aida Mbowa-directed stage play Desperate to Fight about mental violence; and the world-renowned stage dramas Heaven's Gates, Hell's Flames, Restore Tour: Child Soldier No More, and the KAD’s adaption of William Shakespeare's Much Ado About Nothing, the tragedy of Macbeth and Charles Dickens Oliver Twist. She also acted in Silent Voices: a play that reflects the views and emotions of the northern Uganda war.

Oyenbot holds a Bachelor of Arts in Drama from Makerere University. She has also performed in television shows and radio drama series including "Rock point 256" and "Mako-Mere".

She was involved with the Watoto Children's Choir where she supervises children and performs with them while on tour.

Filmography

As an Actress

Film and television

Theatre

Radio Drama

As a Producer

Awards & Nominations

References

External links

Website

Living people
Ugandan film actresses
Ugandan television actresses
People from Kampala
21st-century Ugandan actresses
Ugandan stage actresses
1982 births
Ugandan dancers
21st-century Ugandan women singers
Makerere University alumni